Idahlu (also Romanized as Īdahlū; also known as Īdlū) is a village in Chah Dasht Rural District, Shara District, Hamadan County, Hamadan Province, Iran. At the 2006 census, its population was 66, in 14 families.

References 

Populated places in Hamadan County